Impromptu is the final album by June Christy, recorded in 1977 and featuring the Lou Levy Sextet.

Track listing
 "My Shining Hour" (Harold Arlen, Johnny Mercer) – 3:20
 "Once Upon a Summertime" (Michel Legrand, Mercer) – 4:47
 "Show Me" (Frederick Loewe, Alan Jay Lerner) – 2:23
 "Everything Must Change" (Bernard Ighner) – 6:09
 "Willow Weep for Me" (Ann Ronell) – 4:17
 "I'll Remember April" (Gene de Paul, Patricia Johnston, Don Raye) – 3:48
 "The Trouble With Hello is Goodbye" (Dave Grusin, Alan and Marilyn Bergman) – 3:56
 "Autumn Serenade" (Peter DeRose, Sammy Gallop) – 3:57
 "Sometime Ago" (Sergio Mihanovich) – 4:08
 "Angel Eyes" (Matt Dennis, Earl Brent) – 4:41

Personnel
 June Christy – vocals
 Lou Levy – piano
 Jack Sheldon – trumpet
 Frank Rosolino – trombone
 Bob Cooper – tenor saxophone, flute
 Bob Daugherty – bass
 Shelly Manne – drums

Recorded at United/Western Studios, Los Angeles, California 7, 8 & 9 June 1977

References

June Christy albums
Interplay Records albums